The Jordanian Armed Forces (JAF) (romanized: Al-Quwwat Al-Musallaha Al-Urduniyya), also referred to as the  Arab Army (Al-Jaysh Al-Arabi), are the military forces of the Hashemite Kingdom of Jordan. They consist of the ground forces, air force, and navy. They are under the direct control of the King of Jordan who is the Supreme Commander of the Jordanian Armed Forces. The current Chairman of the Joint Chiefs of Staff is Major General Yousef Huneiti, who is also the King's military adviser.

The first organized army in Jordan was established on 22 October 1920, and was named the "Mobile Force". At the time it only had 150 men in its ranks. On its third anniversary in 1923, the force was renamed the Arab Legion, consisting of 1,000 men. By the time Jordan became an independent state in 1946, the Arab Legion numbered some 8,000 soldiers in 3 mechanized regiments. In 1956, King Hussein dismissed all British generals and changed the name of the Legion into the "Jordanian Arab Army" in what became known as the Arabization of the Jordanian Army command.

The army fought in several wars and battles, mostly against Israel. In the 1948 Arab–Israeli War, the capture of the West Bank by Jordan and the decisive Battles of Latrun, proved that the Arab Legion was the most effective army during the war. Several confrontations followed with Israel, resulting in mixed success;  they included the Retribution operations, the Six-Day War, the War of Attrition and Yom Kippur War. Jordan also had to face the PLO and the Syrian Army during the events of Black September. The signing of the Israel–Jordan peace treaty in 1994 ended the state of belligerency between the two countries.

It is today considered to be among the most professional in the region, and is seen as particularly well-trained, organized, and equipped.

History 

The first organized army in Jordan was established on 22 October 1920, and was named the "Mobile Force", at the time it was 150 man strong under the command of the British Captain Frederick Peake. On its third anniversary, in October 1923, the now-1,000-man force was renamed the Arab Legion.

In 1939, John Bagot Glubb, better known as Glubb Pasha, became the Legion's commander, and continued in office until the dismissal of British officers in March 1956. On 1 April 1926, the Transjordan Frontier Force was formed, consisting of only 150 men and most of them were stationed along Transjordan's roads.

The Arabization of the Jordanian Army command (Arabic: تعريب قيادة الجيش العربي, Ta'reeb Qiyadat Al-Jaysh Al-Arabi) saw the dismissal of senior British officers commanding the Arab Legion by King Hussein and the subsequent renaming of the Legion into the Jordanian Armed Forces on 1 March 1956. Glubb Pasha, the Arab Legion's British commander, was replaced with Major General Radi Annab, who became the first Arab commander of the Arab Legion. Hussein's intentions to Arabize the Army command were to replace British officers with Jordanian officers, assert political independence from Britain, and improve relations with neighboring Arab states that viewed the British with suspicion. An annual celebration is held on 1 March in Jordan to mark the historic event.

Timeline of the history and development of the Jordanian Army and the Arab Legion:
{| class="wikitable"
|-
| 1920–1947 || Pre-1948 War || 1948 War || Battles – 1956 || Kuwait – 1963
|-
| Sammu Battle – 1966 || Six-Day War – 1967 || 1967–1973 || After 1977 || 2000–present
|}

Structure and objectives 

The army's organisational structure was traditionally based on two armoured divisions and two mechanized divisions. These have been transformed into a lighter, more mobile forces, based largely on a brigade structure and considered better capable of rapid reaction in emergencies. An armoured division has become the core element of a strategic reserve.

The main objectives of the Jordanian Armed Forces are:
 Protect the Kingdom of Jordan borders from any invasion.
 Protect the people inside the Kingdom and their rights.
 Protect the King of Jordan.

Special Operations Forces 

Founded on April 15, 1963, on the orders of the late King Hussein, its primary roles include reconnaissance, counter-terrorism, search and evacuation, intelligence gathering combat, and the protection of key sites. King Abdullah II Special Forces Group are also charged with carrying out precision strikes against critical enemy targets. The unit is equipped and trained to be able to operate behind enemy lines for long periods without any logistical support, and is considered one of the finest special forces units in the world.

The group is supported by the newly founded Sheikh Mohammed bin Zayed (MbZ) Quick Reaction Force (QRF) Brigade which is a brigade-strength forces with high combat readiness, immediate response speed, flexible and highly mobile that are able to operate independently, within Jordanian forces, or with friendly and allied forces to defend Jordanian national security within the borders of the Kingdom of Jordan or Outside in all circumstances at the time and place and in accordance with the orders of the General Command of the Armed Forces.

Defense industry 

Jordan is a recent entrant to the domestic defense industry with the establishment of King Abdullah Design and Development Bureau (KADDB) in 1999. The defense industrial initiative is intended to jumpstart industrialization across a range of sectors. With the Jordanian defense expenditures at 8.7% of GDP, the Jordanian authorities created the defense industry to utilize defense budget spending power and to assist in economic growth without placing additional demands on the national budget. Jordan also hosts SOFEX, the world's fastest growing and region's only special operations and homeland security exhibition and conference. Jordan is a regional and international provider of advanced military goods and services.

A KADDB Industrial Park was opened in September 2009 in Mafraq. It is an integral industrial free zone specialized in defense industries and vehicles and machinery manufacturing. By 2015, the park is expected to provide around 15,000 job opportunities whereas the investment volume is expected to reach JD500 million.

Peacekeeping 
The Jordanian Armed Forces has been a strong supporter and participant of UN peacekeeping missions. Jordan ranks among the highest internationally in taking part in UN peacekeeping missions. The size of the Jordanian participation in various areas of the United Nations peacekeeping troops and staff, hospital and international observers, is estimated to be 61,611 officers and men, starting in 1989 in Angola through the task of military observers and humanitarian security forces. After France and the UK, Jordan was the largest contributor of troops to the UN forces in the former Yugoslavia, sending three battalions, or over three thousand troops, from 1993 to 1996.

At the U.N. Copenhagen summit, Jordan was alone, out of more than 30 developing nations, in unveiling plans to help fight climate change, including upgrading its armed forces by 2020, an area usually overlooked in the global warming debate. The army will seek to upgrade engines and old vehicles and use energy saving technologies.

International assistance 

In addition to providing domestic and border security for the country, the Jordanian Armed Forces have assumed a prominent regional and international role as a provider of humanitarian assistance and military training. The Jordanian Armed Forces recently cooperated with Jordan Hashemite Charity Organization to send humanitarian aid including rescue equipment, tents, logistical support, medical supplies, and food to Syria and Turkey following the 2023 Turkey-Syria Earthquake.

Medical services 
Jordan has dispatched several field hospitals to conflict zones and areas affected by natural disasters across the world such as Iraq, the West Bank, Lebanon, Afghanistan, Haiti, Indonesia, Congo, Liberia, Ethiopia, Eritrea, Sierra Leone, and Pakistan. The Kingdom's field hospitals have extended aid to some one million people in the West Bank and 55,000 in Lebanon.

On 24 November 2010, another Jordanian military field hospital (Gaza 11) arrived in the coastal territory of Gaza to replace (Gaza 10) whose tour of duty came to an end after treating 44,000 Palestinians and performing 720 minor and major surgeries since its inception in September 2010.

Police and military training 
The Jordanians have helped Iraqis by providing them with military and police training as well as donating military and police equipment. The armed forces trained tens of thousands of Iraqi troops and policemen after the U.S.-led invasion.

Jordan has also begun training Libyan policemen as part of a programme to strengthen ties between the countries. The training programme is part of a wider plan to re-integrate 200,000 former rebel fighters into Libyan society.

Gallery

References

External links 

 Jordanian Armed Forces

 

Ministry of Defence (Jordan)